John Erman (August 3, 1935 – June 25, 2021) was an American television director, producer, and actor. He was nominated for ten Primetime Emmy Awards, winning once for the film Who Will Love My Children? (1983). He also won two Directors Guild of America Awards for the miniseries Roots (1977) and the film An Early Frost (1985).

Career 

Born in Chicago, Illinois, Erman spent the early years of his career, after a few small roles in films such as The Cosmic Man (1957), directing episodes of such primetime series as Peyton Place, The Fugitive, The Outer Limits (original series), Stoney Burke, Ben Casey, My Favorite Martian, That Girl, The Flying Nun, Marcus Welby, M.D., Star Trek (original series), and Judd, for the Defense.

Erman directed episodes of Roots and its sequel, Roots: The Next Generations, as well as Alex Haley's Queen. He helmed many television films, including Alexander: The Other Side of Dawn, Green Eyes, Child of Glass, The Scarlett O'Hara War, Who Will Love My Children?, A Streetcar Named Desire, The Two Mrs. Grenvilles, Right to Kill?, An Early Frost, The Atlanta Child Murders, The Attic: The Hiding of Anne Frank, David, Breathing Lessons, Scarlett, The Sunshine Boys, Too Rich: The Secret Life of Doris Duke, The Boys Next Door, and Candles on Bay Street, many of which he also produced.

Erman directed the feature films Making It (1971), Ace Eli and Rodger of the Skies (1973, credited as Bill Sampson) and Stella (1990).

Death
Erman died on June 25, 2021 in New York City, New York after a brief illness, at age 85.

Awards and nominations

Primetime Emmy Awards

Directors Guild of America Awards

Filmography

Films

Television

References

External links

MSN Movies bio

1935 births
2021 deaths
American television directors
Television producers from Illinois
Film directors from Illinois
Primetime Emmy Award winners
Male actors from Chicago
Directors Guild of America Award winners
Businesspeople from Chicago